Kundi Miki (born 1947) is a former Papua New Guinea international lawn bowler.

Bowls career
Miki has represented Papua New Guinea the Commonwealth Games, in the fours at the 1998 Commonwealth Games.

He won a bronze medal at the 1995 Asia Pacific Bowls Championships, in the triples in Dunedin.

References

1947 births
Living people
Bowls players at the 1998 Commonwealth Games
Papua New Guinean male bowls players